The German Indoor Championships or officially the West German Indoor Championships was a men's and women's international tennis tournament founded in 1911 as the German Covered Court Championships or German International Covered Court Championships and first played on indoor wood courts at the Bremen Tennis Club. The tournament was mainly held in Bremen, West Germany, but was also played at other locations for the duration of its run. In 1981 the championships were last held in Stuttgart then it was discontinued.

History
In 1911 German indoor championships were established at the Bremen Tennis Club, Bremen, Germany. In 1955 the tournament was rebranded as the West German Covered Court Championships. or West German International Covered Court Championships In 1966 the tournaments name was changed again to the West German Indoor Championships.

The championships were mainly played Bremen Tennis Club (f.1896), Bremen, Germany which had built an indoor facility for staging this tournament. The championships continued to be held in Bremen until 1939. In 1940 the event moved to Hamburg until 1941. From 1942 till tournament was not held due to World War Two and the rebuilding of Germany under the Marshall Plan.

In 1955 the tournament was revived under a new title as the West German Covered Court Championships and, moved to Cologne it remained there until 1961. In 1962 the championships were moved back to Bremen then they alternated between Cologne and the former until 1969. In 1970 the event moved to Munich for one edition only, before returning to Bremen till 1979. In 1980 the German Indoor Championships were moved to Stuttgart and remained there until 1981 when they were abolished.

Surface
The championships were played almost exclusively of indoor wood courts from inception until 1973 at all locations. The tournament then continued to played on indoor hard courts and indoor carpet courts until 1981.

References

Carpet court tennis tournaments
Wood court tennis tournaments
Hard court tennis tournaments
Defunct tennis tournaments in Germany